Corinthian or Corinthians may refer to:

Several Pauline epistles, books of the New Testament of the Bible:
First Epistle to the Corinthians
Second Epistle to the Corinthians 
Third Epistle to the Corinthians (Orthodox)
A demonym relating to the port of Corinth or the regional unit of Corinthia in Greece
Corinthian order, a classical order of ancient Greek and Roman architecture
Residents or people from the town of Corinth (town), New York
The League of Corinth, a federation of ancient Greek states
Corinthian Colleges, a post secondary education company in North America currently under criminal investigation in the US.
Corinthian (comics), a character in The Sandman comics
The Corinthian (novel), novel by Georgette Heyer
The Corinthian (New York), a skyscraper in New York City
The Corinthian helmet, a style of helmet worn by hoplites in classical Greece
Corinthian leather, a marketing term used by Chrysler
Corinthian (horse), American racehorse, a 2007 Breeders' Cup winner
Corinthian bagatelle, occasionally called Corinthians

Sports 
 amateur sport; in particular
 Victorian ideal of the gentleman amateur
 Corinthian, amateur yachter
Corinthian Yacht Club (disambiguation), several yacht clubs with this name 
Sport Club Corinthians Paulista, Brazilian professional football club
Corinthian F.C., a former English amateur football club
Corinthian-Casuals F.C., English football club formed by Corinthian F.C. and Casuals F.C.
Corinthian F.C. (Kent), another former English football club, which attempted to emulate the ideals of the Corinthians
Cardiff Corinthians F.C., Welsh football club
Corinthians USA, a professional football club based in Fontana, California
Sport Club Corinthians Alagoano, a professional football club in Brazil named after the other Brazilian club
Atlético Clube Coríntians, a professional football club in Brazil
Sport Club Corinthians Paranaense, a former professional football club in Brazil, dissolved in 2017
Esporte Clube Corinthians, a professional football club in Brazil
Esporte Clube Corinthians de Bataguassu, a professional football club in Brazil
Seawanhaka Corinthian Yacht Club, a yacht club located in Oyster Bay, New York.
Corinthians A.F.C. (Isle of Man), a Manx football club
Galway Corinthians RFC, an Irish rugby club